The 1999 Cork Senior Football Championship was the 111th staging of the Cork Senior Football Championship since its establishment by the Cork County Board in 1887. The draw for the opening fixtures took place on 11 December 1998. The championship began on 1 May 1999 and ended on 14 November 1999.

Bantry Blues entered the championship as the defending champions, however, they were defeated by University College Cork in a second round replay.

On 14 November 1999, University College Cork won the championship following a 1-11 to 1-08 defeat of Nemo Rangers in a replay of the final. This was their 9th championship title overall and their first title since 1973.

Ballincollig's Podsie O'Mahony was the championship's top scorer with 1-34.

Team changes

To Championship

Promoted from the Cork Intermediate Football Championship
 St Michael's

Results

First round

Second round

Quarter-finals

Semi-finals

Finals

Championship statistics

Top scorers

Top scorers overall

Top scorers in a single game

References

Cork Senior Football Championship
Cork Senior Football Championship